Family Style may refer to:

 Family Style (Vaughan Brothers album), 1990
 Family Style (Jet video album), 2004
 Family Style (TV series), a reality television series